The Chinese elm cultivar Ulmus parvifolia 'Burnley Select' was grown from seed taken from a tree at the Burnley (horticultural) College, University of Melbourne, and selected by Dr Peter May.

Description
This budded elm is a narrow-spreading tree with good, upright branch attachment. The original tree in Kyneton, Victoria, is about 12 m tall by 6 m broad. Unlike many other upright selections of Ulmus parvifolia, the tree is reputed to have little included bark.

Pests and diseases
The species and its cultivars are highly resistant, but not immune, to Dutch elm disease, and unaffected by the elm leaf beetle Xanthogaleruca luteola.

Cultivation
'Burnley Select' is not known to be in cultivation beyond Australia.

Accessions
None known

Nurseries

Australasia

Metro Trees, Alphington, Victoria, Australia.

References

Chinese elm cultivar
Ulmus articles missing images
Ulmus